Charaxes protoclea, the flame-bordered emperor or flame-bordered charaxes, is a butterfly of the family Nymphalidae. It is found Subsaharan Africa. It is a common forest charaxes.

Description

The wingspan is 65–70 mm in males and 75–95 mm in females. Ch. protoclea Feisth. has the forewing above unicolorous black, only in cellules la—2 with orange-yellow marginal spots or with orange-yellow marginal band; hindwing above also deep black but with very broad orange-yellow marginal band, 10 mm. in breadth at vein 3, usually enclosing a black dot in cellules lc and 6; the under surface of both wings dark umber-brown with the markings ferruginous, only 
in cellule lc of the forewing black; the costal margin of the forewing not lighter than the ground-colour. The female is quite unlike the male and has on both surfaces a very broad white median band, which in cellules 3—7 of the forewing is more or less completely broken up into spots; the ground-colour is above blackish, beneath lighter grey-brown than in the male the forewing above as in the male only with orange-yellow marginal spots in cellules la—-2; the yellow marginal band on the upperside of the hindwing only 3 mm. in breadth. Senegambia 
to Angola. — nothodes Jord, connects the type-form with azota, the marginal spots of the forewing being better developed than in the former, but less than in azota, and the submarginal spots not so complete as in azota. Tanganyika. — azota Hew. must be regarded as the eastern race. The only differs in having  the orange-yellow marginal band on the upperside of the fore wing extending to the apex and preceded by a transverse row of orange-yellow submarginal spots, which are or less confluent with the marginal ones. The female
has a still broader white median band on the upper surface, on the forewing broken up into two rows of spots in cellules 2—7, of which the distal row is formed of large orange-yellow spots; the orange-yellow marginal band on the forewing above is complete, as in the male . Distributed in East Africa from Delagoa Bay to Nyassaland and British East Africa, male-ab. nyasana Btlr. only differs in having the marginal and submarginal spots on the upperside of the forewing connected as far as vein 5, enclosing a black spot; in the normal form these spots are already separated in cellule 4. Nyassaland.

Biology
Has two broods from October to November and from February to June.

The habitat is Miombo woodland.

Larvae feed on Afzelia quanzensis, Brachystegia spiciformis, and Julbernardia globiflora.

Notes on the biology of protoclea are given by Kielland (1990), (1991) and Pringle et al (1994) <ref>Kielland, J. 1990 Butterflies of Tanzania. Hill House, Melbourne and London: 1-363.</refApollo Books, Svendborg, Denmark: 1-595</ref> .

Taxonomy
Charaxes cynthia group

The group members are
Charaxes cynthia similar to Charaxes lucretius
Charaxes protoclea
Charaxes boueti close to next
Charaxes lasti close to last
Charaxes alticola

Subspecies
Listed alphabetically.
C. p. azota (Hewitson, 1877)  (Kenya, Tanzania, north-eastern Zambia, Malawi, eastern Zimbabwe, southern Mozambique, South Africa: KwaZulu-Natal)
C. p. catenaria Rousseau-Decelle, 1934 (Democratic Republic of the Congo, western Tanzania, Zambia)
C. p. cedrici  Canu, 1989 (Bioko)
C. p. nothodes Jordan, 1911 (Democratic Republic of the Congo, western Uganda, north-western Tanzania)
C. p. protoclea Feisthamel, 1850 (Senegal, Gambia, Guinea-Bissau, Guinea, Sierra Leone, Liberia, Ivory Coast, Ghana, Togo, western Nigeria)
C. p. protonothodes van Someren, 1971 (Nigeria, Cameroon, Central African Republic, Gabon, Congo, north-western Angola, north-western Democratic Republic of the Congo)

Subspecies gallery

References

Victor Gurney Logan Van Someren, 1971 Revisional notes on African Charaxes (Lepidoptera: Nymphalidae). Part VII. Bulletin of the British Museum (Natural History) (Entomology)181-226.

External links
Images of C. protoclea azota Royal Museum for Central Africa (Albertine Rift Project)
Images of C.  protoclea catenaria (Albertine Rift Project)
Images of C. protoclea nothodes (Albertine Rift Project)
Images of C. protoclea protoclea  (Albertine Rift Project)
Charaxes protoclea images at Consortium for the Barcode of Life
Charaxes protoclea protoclea images  at BOLD
Charaxes protoclea azota images  at BOLD
Charaxes protoclea catenaria images  at BOLD
Charaxes protoclea cedreici images  at BOLD
Charaxes protoclea nothodes images  at BOLD
Charaxes protoclea protonothodes images at BOLD
Seitz, A. Die Gross-Schmetterlinge der Erde 13: Die Afrikanischen Tagfalter. Plate XIII 31 d ssp. azota

protoclea
Butterflies described in 1850